The 1960–61 Liga Leumit season saw Hapoel Petah Tikva crowned champions for the third successive season. Hapoel's Zecharia Ratzabi and Hapoel Haifa's Shlomo Levi were the joint top scorers with 15 goals each.

Beitar Tel Aviv were relegated to Liga Alef.

Final table

Results

References
Israel - List of final tables RSSSF

Liga Leumit seasons
Israel
1960–61 in Israeli football leagues